Roe River may refer to several rivers.

 Roe River, Montana, United States
 Roe River (Western Australia), Australia

See also
 River Roe, County Londonderry, Northern Ireland
 Roe Beck, Cumbria, England, also known as the River Roe in its lower reaches